Babacar Cissé (born 2 December 1975) is a retired Senegalese professional basketball player. He spent the biggest part of his career playing in France. He was also a member of the Senegal national basketball team.

References

1975 births
Living people
Senegalese expatriate basketball people in France
JA Vichy players
Senegalese men's basketball players
STB Le Havre players
Point guards
2006 FIBA World Championship players